Jaigopal Garodia Vivekananda Vidyalaya is a school in Anna Nagar, Chennai. This school is part of the Jaigopal Garodia Foundation. In 2009, the school's principal, G Vijayakumar, received a Best Teacher Award.

References

Schools in Chennai